Korsakov, sometimes spelled as Korsakoff, or Korsakova (feminine; Ко́рсакова), is a Russian surname. Notable people with the surname include:

Alexander Dondukov-Korsakov (1820–1893), Russian knyaz, cavalry general, Imperial Commissioner in Bulgaria
Andrey Korsakov (1916–2007), Russian and Ukrainian linguist and language philosopher
Alexander Rimsky-Korsakov (1753–1840), infantry general
Andrey Rimsky-Korsakov (1878–1940), Russian musicologist, son of the composer Nikolai Rimsky-Korsakov
Dmitry Korsakov (1843–1920), Russian historian
Nikolai Rimsky-Korsakov (1844–1908), Russian composer
Pyotr Korsakov (1790–1844), Russian writer
Semyon Korsakov (1788–1853), Russian homeopath and inventor
Sergei Korsakoff (1854–1900), Russian neuropsychiatrist
Korsakoff's syndrome, a brain disease caused by chronic alcoholism named after Sergei Korsakoff

There was a Korsakov family who owned the building that now occupies the Lensovet Theatre in Saint Petersburg, in the early 20th century. The last heir was Sofya Alekseevna Korsakova, who married a prince of the House of Golitsyn.

References

Russian-language surnames